Salmon River Lake is a small community in the province of Nova Scotia, Canada, located in the Municipality of the District of Guysborough in Guysborough County.  It is situated at the eastern end of a lake by the same name.

References
Salmon River Lake on Destination Nova Scotia

Communities in Guysborough County, Nova Scotia
General Service Areas in Nova Scotia